Abdullah Salah Al-Disi is a retired Jordanian footballer of Palestinian origin.

External links 
 
 

1987 births
Living people
Jordanian footballers
Jordan international footballers
Jordan youth international footballers
Association football forwards
Jordanian people of Palestinian descent
Sportspeople from Amman
Al-Wehdat SC players
Al-Sheikh Hussein FC players
Shabab Al-Khalil SC players
Jordanian Pro League players
West Bank Premier League players
Jordanian expatriate footballers
Jordanian expatriate sportspeople in the State of Palestine
Expatriate footballers in the State of Palestine